Witiness Chimoio João Quembo (born 26 August 1996), known as Witi, is a Mozambican professional footballer who plays for Portuguese club Nacional as a winger.

Club career
Born in Beira, Witi began his career with Sporting Club da Beira. In the Summer of 2014, he moved to Portugal, joining the youth ranks of C.D. Nacional.

On 11 January 2015, Witi made his senior debut with Nacional in a home win against Boavista F.C., for Primeira Liga. Just three days later, he scored his first professional goal in a Taça da Liga match against Moreirense F.C. Later that month, Witi signed a deal with S.L. Benfica until the end of the season.

In June 2015, Witi returned to Nacional.

International career
Witi made his debut for Mozambique in 2015, and represented the nation at the 2015 COSAFA Cup.

International goals
Scores and results list Mozambique's goal tally first.

Honors
Mozambique
COSAFA Cup runner-up:2015

References

External links
 
 
 

1996 births
Living people
People from Beira, Mozambique
Mozambican footballers
Association football midfielders
Primeira Liga players
C.D. Nacional players
S.L. Benfica footballers
Mozambique international footballers
Mozambican expatriate footballers
Expatriate footballers in Portugal
Mozambican expatriate sportspeople in Portugal